Rajya Sabha elections were held on various dates in 2012, to elect members of the Rajya Sabha, Indian Parliament's upper chamber.  The elections were held in January to elect respectively 3 members from NCT of Delhi, one member from Sikkim, and in March for 57 members from 15 States for the Rajya Sabha and in June for three members from Kerala.
 
The bye-elections to Council of States were also held from the States of Uttar Pradesh and Maharashtra.

January Elections

NCT of Delhi

Sikkim

March Elections

Andhra Pradesh

Bihar

Chhattisgarh

Gujarat

Haryana

Himachal Pradesh

Jharkhand

Karnataka

Madhya Pradesh

Maharashtra

Odisha

Rajasthan

Uttar Pradesh

Uttarakhand

West Bengal

June Election

Kerala

Bye-elections
The following bye-elections were held in the year 2012.

 The bye election was held, to fill the vacancy caused by death of Brij Bhushan Tiwari representing Uttar Pradesh. Alok Tiwari was elected unopposed on June 18, 2012,  with the term till 2 April 2018.
 The bye election was held, to fill the vacancy caused by death of Vilasrao Deshmukh representing Maharashtra. Rajni Patil was elected unopposed on December 30,  with the term till 2 April 2018.

References

2012 elections in India
2012